OSMECON is an undergraduate medical conference hosted annually by Osmania Medical College and its associated hospitals in Hyderabad, India.

OSMECON is a three-day event, typically scheduled in August each year. Started in 2010 as a platform for medical undergraduates to present their research, the conference's oeuvre has since expanded to include numerous workshops, clinical case discussions, quizzes, guest lectures, panel discussions and symposia, with international delegates in attendance since 2014.

One of the main goals of OSMECON in recent years has been to equip participants with current clinical skills as well as an understanding of basic and clinical research techniques. Another main focus has been the recent developments, future opportunities and challenges that medical research presents at all levels of training, with particular emphasis on the Indian context.

OSMECON-2010 

 OSMECON started in 2010 as a one-day event restricted to the state. The event was first organised by the then final year students Sai Prasad Narsingam, Mohammed Imaduddin and Rubina Ansari.
 Dr. C. Raghu, Interventional Cardiologist and Director – Prime Hospitals, Hyderabad graced OSMECON as the Chief guest.
 It was a single day event with case, paper and poster presentation as the main events with 40 delegates.

OSMECON-2011 
The conference reached out to other medical colleges in erstwhile Andhra Pradesh. It was a two-day event conducted on the 25 and 26 of August 2011 with 100 delegates. The following were introduced for the first time.

 Poster presentation on Nanotechnology & Robotics in medicine
 MedQuiz on Antimicrobial resistance
 Seminar on Research Methodology-by Dr.VishnuVardan Rao, NIN, Hyderabad.

OSMECON-2012 
Dr. B. Sesi Kiran, Former Director of NIN gave a lecture on Research Methodology and Dr. Sreekanth Vemula, Eminent Neurophysician, graced the event.

It was a 3-day event held from 31 August to 2 September with 400 delegates.

The highlight of the conference was the introduction of workshops for undergraduate medical students.

 Basic Life Support Skills,
 Basic Surgical Skills,
 Safe Shift of Trauma victim.

OSMECON-2013 

 Bharat Ratna Dr. A.P.J. Abdul Kalam, Former President of India graced the conference and made it a historical memory for everyone.
 Dr. Arun Tiwari, DRDO Scientist, adjunct professor HCU and co-author of several books with Dr.Kalam also spoke about "Squaring the circle - 7 steps to Indian Renaissance".
 It was a 4-day event with the participation of over 700 delegates and had 3 workshops on:  Basic Life Support Skills,     Basic Surgical Skills,     Obstetrics and Neonatology.

OSMECON-2014 
Dr. Ch. Mohan Rao, Director CCMB & Dr.Kalpagam Polasa, former Director of NIN inaugurated the event and spoke of the research scenario in the country.

Dr. Gullapalli Nageswara Rao, Founder of LV Prasad Eye Hospital, delivered a guest lecture.

Theme of the conference: Mental Health Awareness

The Panel discussion anchored by Prof Pari Plavi remains one of the most productive events at Osmecon. Dr Mahender  Vyasabattu, Director  of Oslers Academy, well recognized in the field of international postgraduate training, Prof Manisha Sahai, MD. DM and DNB examiner, Dr Kanaka Durga, Scientist & Genecist and Dr Mamidi, ICMR-B Scientist participated and shared their expertise. The video clips are still viewed by thousands of postgraduate training  aspirants. 

There were 800 delegates with 7 from Nepal. The following events were introduced:

   MedTech
   Panel Discussion
   Medical Dumbcharades
   Medical Short films

OSMECON-2015 
Padma Shri Dr. Kakarla Subba Rao, internationally renowned radiologist and Father of Radiology in India, inaugurated the event.

Padma Shri Dr. L.Narendranath, eminent Orthopaedic surgeon delivered a guest lecture on 'IT Solutions in Health Care'.

Theme of Poster Presentation : 3-D Printing in Medicine, Novel Drug Delivery Systems

It was a 3-day event with the participation of over 1,000 delegates and had 5 workshops on:

1) Basic Life Support Skills,

2) Basic Surgical Skills,

3) ECG Interpretation

4) Basic Medical imaging

5) Obstetrics & Neonatology,

6) Orthopaedic skills and Trauma Care.

OSMECON-2016 
Padmashri Dr. A.Gopala Krishna Gokhale (Cardiothoracic Surgeon, First Minimal Access Heart Surgeon & First Heart-Kidney combined Transplant Surgeon) delivered the Inaugural Address.

Dr. G.V. Ramana Rao (Executive Partner, Head of Emergency Medicine Learning Centre (EMLC) and Research division at GVK-EMRI) was the Guest of Honour

Dr. G. Jagdishwar Goud, renowned Surgical Oncologist and Robotic Surgeon spoke about trends in Robotic Surgery.

Dr. M. Pari Plavi, distinguished alumna of Osmania Medical College, former Professor and Head of Department of Anatomy at Osmania Medical College, Founder-Convener of OSMECON, discussed the Neuroscience of Adolescence and Meditation.

Theme of Poster Presentation: Cancer Immunotherapy, Personalised Medicine

There were about 1,100 delegates attending from all over the country.

OSMECON-2017 
Dr. K. Srinath Reddy, President of Public Health Foundation of India delivered the inaugural address.

Dr. Patanjali Dev Nayar, Regional Advisor, Disability & Injury Prevention, WHO SEARO delivered a lecture on "Manoeuvring crossroads to human sexuality".

Theme of the conference:  Adolescent & Reproductive Health.

Over 1,400 delegates participated in the eighth edition, with over 120 international delegates, taking the event to a bigger stage. Two new workshops were introduced:

1) Chest Sounds Interpretation

2) Forensic Autopsy

OSMECON-2018 
The 9th edition of OSMECON was held on August 10, 11 & 12 at Osmania Medical College, Hyderabad.

Padmashree Dr. Dasari Prasad Rao, former Director of Nizam Institute of Medical sciences, Hyderabad graced the event as the Chief guest.

Dr. Arvinder Singh Soin, reputed Hepato-Biliary surgeon(1st successful liver transplant in the country). He spoke about "Will AI in medicine make doctors redundant?".

The conference added 4 new workshops to its list.

 Arterial Blood Gas Analysis
 Interactive Genomics
 Soft Skills

OSMECON-2019 
The 10th Edition of OSMECON was held in August, 2019 from the 8th to the 10th.The esteemed event was honoured by:

Dr. Sowmya Swaminathan(Ch. Scientist at the World Health Organisation WHO) was the honourable Chief Guest.

Padmashree Dr. Prakash Baba Amte and Dr. Mandakini Amte who shared the Ramon Magsaysay award both gave guest lectures.

Dr. Rakesh Mishra, CCMB Director.

Dr. Hemalatha, National Institute of Nutrition NIN Director.

Dr. Ravi Wankhedkar, National Resident of IMA, New Delhi also graced the event.

The Annual UG Conference was attended by nearly 2000 delegates from 7 states across the country as well as from 5 different countries, still expanding its reach even further.
Few futuristic and technological areas of medical research were also presented during the symposiums 'Nanotechnology in cancer treatment' and '3D Bioprinting'.

OSMECON 2020
The 11th Annual UG Conference will be held in August 2020 at Osmania Medical College, Hyderabad.

References

http://www.knowafest.com/2014/08/osmecon-2014-osmania-medical-college-medical-college-festival-hyderabad.html

http://www.newindianexpress.com/cities/hyderabad/Kalam-opens-OSMECON/2013/08/28/article1755611.ece

Medical conferences